The 2006 Sam Houston State Bearkats football team represented Sam Houston State University as a member of the Southland Conference during the 2006 NCAA Division I FCS football season. Led by second-year head coach Todd Whitten, the Bearkats compiled an overall record of 6–5 with a mark of 4–2 in conference play, and finished tied for second in the Southland.

Schedule

References

Sam Houston
Sam Houston Bearkats football seasons
Sam Houston State Bearkats football